Wilma Goich (born 16 October 1945) is an Italian pop singer and television personality.

Career 
Born in Cairo Montenotte, Savona, Goich began her career in 1964, when she released her first single "Dopo il sole pioverà". 

She scored two domestic hits in 1966 and 1968 with the songs "In un fiore" and "Gli occhi miei", which peaked respectively sixth and seventh place on the Italian charts. Between 1971 and 1979 Goich formed with her then-husband Edoardo Vianello the folk-pop duo Vianella. In 1991 she joined the TV presenter Mike Bongiorno in the Canale 5 quiz show Tris. Goich entered the Sanremo Music Festival competition six times between 1965 and 1994.

References

External links
 

 
 

1945 births
People from Cairo Montenotte
Italian pop singers
Living people 
Italian television personalities
20th-century Italian women singers
21st-century Italian women singers